Mana, in Melanesian and Polynesian mythology, is the spiritual life force energy or healing power that permeates the universe.

Mana may also refer to:

Arts, entertainment and media

Music
 Maná, a Mexican rock group
Maná (album), 1987
 Mana (Nemesea album), 2004
 Mana (Finnish musician)
 Mana (Japanese musician)
 Mana, Japanese musician and member of Chai
 Mana Mana, a Finnish rock group
 Mana Music, a music supervision company based in Australia and New Zealand
 Mana and Mani, a 1979 children's opera

Other uses in arts, entertainment and media
 Mana (gaming), or magic, an attribute assigned to characters in role-playing or video games
 Mana (series), a role-playing game series 
 Mana, a title serialized in South Korean manhwa magazine Wink

People

 Mana (given name), including a list of people and fictional characters with the name
 Florent Parfait Mana, Malagasy politician
 Laura Mañá (born 1968), Spanish film director
 Mohammed Mana (born 1950), Nigerian politician
 Rabbi Mana II, a Jewish Amora sage

Places

Communities
 Mana, Burkina Faso
 Mana (woreda), Ethiopia
 Mana, French Guiana
 Mana, India
 Mana, Orhei, Moldova
 Mana, New Zealand
 Mana railway station
 Mana (New Zealand electorate)
 Maná, Corozal, Puerto Rico
 Mana (Ivanjica), Serbia
 Maňa, Slovakia
 La Maná Canton, Ecuador

Features
 Mana (river), in Krasnoyarsk Krai, Russia
 Mana (French Guiana), a river 
 Måna, a river in Tinn, Norway
 Mana Island (disambiguation), several uses
 Mana Mountain, Antarctica
 Mana Pass, a mountain pass between India and Tibet
 Mana Peak, a mountain in India

Politics
 Mana Movement, formerly the Mana Party, in New Zealand 
 Mana Party (India)

Religion and mythology
 Māna, a Buddhist term for 'pride', 'arrogance', or 'conceit'
 Mana (Mandaeism), a term roughly equivalent to the philosophical concept of 'nous' 
 Mana, or tuonela, the realm of the dead or the underworld in Finnish mythology

Other uses
 Mana College, in Porirua, Wellington, New Zealand

See also

 MANA (disambiguation)
 Manas (disambiguation)
 Manna (disambiguation)
 Manna, a food mentioned in the Bible and Quran